Sphenomorphus vanheurni  is a species of skink. It is found in Java and Bali, Indonesia.

References

vanheurni
Reptiles of Indonesia
Endemic fauna of Indonesia
Taxa named by Leo Brongersma
Reptiles described in 1942